Orthomorpha is a genus of millipedes in the family Paradoxosomatidae containing approximately 50 species distributed in Southeast Asia.

Description
Species of Orthomorpha possess 20 body segments and range from 15–50 mm long as adults. They range from 1.1–3.1 mm in body width, with prominent paranota (lateral keels) extending the width to 1.5–6.7 mm. Base coloration varies from brown to black, with brightly colored paranota and markings in various shades of yellow, orange, and brown, which becomes fainter in alcohol-preserved specimens. Some species have prominent bumps or "tubercles" on their dorsal metatergal segments.

Distribution
Orthomorpha species range from Myanmar in the west, through the entire Indochinese Peninsula, to Lombok, Indonesia.
The species O. coarctata, (also known as Asiomorpha coarctata) has been widely introduced by humans in tropics around the world.

Species
The genus was revised by Likhitrakarn, Golovatch & Panha in 2011, who described several new species and assigned two to the new genus Orthomorphoides, yielding a total of 51 named species of Orthomorpha. Three more species from Laos were described in 2014.

References

Polydesmida
Millipedes of Asia
Taxa named by Charles Harvey Bollman
Millipede genera